Earl Thomas Ferrell (born March 27, 1958), is a former professional American football player who was selected by the St. Louis Cardinals in the 5th round of the 1982 NFL Draft. A , 220 lbs. running back from East Tennessee State, Ferrell played his entire NFL career for the Cardinals from 1982 to 1989. He led all Cardinals running backs in rushing yards during the 1988 and 1989 seasons, the team's first two years playing in Phoenix.

He was the second player, and one of only four in the school's history, to be selected in the draft and play in the NFL after playing college football at ETSU.

After a Pro Bowl appearance in each of his final two seasons, Ferrell's career was cut short due to problems with illegal drugs. In 1988, Ferrell reportedly tested positive three times for cocaine and, before the 1990 season, he was suspended for one year because of another failed drug test. He never played in the NFL again. On receiving the news of his suspension, Ferrell chose to retire.

References

1958 births
Living people
People from Halifax, Virginia
American football running backs
East Tennessee State Buccaneers football players
East Tennessee State University alumni
St. Louis Cardinals (football) players
Phoenix Cardinals players
Players of American football from Virginia
National Football League replacement players